Virginia da Cunha (born 15 June 1981, in Cordoba, Argentina) is an Argentine singer, actress, and dancer; also she was a member of the Argentinian girl-group Bandana.

Discography
 See Bandana discography.
 Avión (Virgin Pancakes)

Solo
 TBA (2017)

Singles

Filmography

Film
 Vivir Intentando (2003) as Virginia

Television
 Popstars: Argentina (2001) as herself
 Sin código (2004) as Luz
 Qitapenas (2013) as Paty Morris

Awards
 See Bandana awards.

References

External links
 Official Website
 Virgin Pancakes Fanatic
 Official Website of Bandana

1981 births
Living people
Argentine actresses
21st-century Argentine women singers
Singers from Buenos Aires
Bandana (pop band) members